Nothing Has Changed (stylised as Nothing has changed.) is a compilation album by English musician David Bowie. It was released on 18 November 2014 through Parlophone in the United Kingdom, and Columbia Records and Legacy Recordings in the United States. The album was released in four formats: a triple CD version (sequenced in reverse chronological order), a double CD version (sequenced in chronological order), a double LP version, and a single CD version released exclusive to select countries.

It is the first album to showcase Bowie's entire career up to that point, from his first single "Liza Jane" in 1964 to "Sue (Or in a Season of Crime)", a new composition recorded specifically for the compilation. The different formats of the album all offer different tracks and mixes compared to the others. The three-disc version includes the most, such as songs from Bowie's unreleased 2001 album Toy. The collection also contains numerous discrepancies in its track listings. Its title comes from a lyric in the song "Sunday" from Bowie's 2002 album Heathen. Each of the different formats feature different cover artworks, all designed by Jonathan Barnbrook and all depicting Bowie examining himself in a mirror.

Upon its release, the album debuted at number nine in the UK, becoming Bowie's 29th top 10 album. Following Bowie's death in 2016, it went on to peak at number five in the UK and charted in other countries. It has been certified Gold by the British Phonographic Industry (BPI) in the UK. The three-disc version of Nothing Has Changed received critical acclaim, with many praising its reverse sequencing as offering a different way to enjoy the artist's career. However, it attracted criticism for its exclusion of Bowie's Tin Machine period, as well as its under-representation of the Berlin Trilogy (1977–1979). Nevertheless, it is considered one of Bowie's best compilation albums.

A revised version of the two-disc Nothing Has Changed, re-titled Bowie Legacy, was released on 11 November 2016 and includes selections from his final album Blackstar (2016).

Background and content
On 9 September 2014, an announcement was posted on Bowie's website and Facebook page: "It is with much pleasure that we can exclusively announce a career-spanning collection of Bowie's music covering fifty years of recorded works from his 1964 debut, 'Liza Jane', through to a brand new recording made this year. Nothing Has Changed compiles tracks from every period of Bowie's career and features new single; 'Sue (Or in a Season of Crime)', which was specially recorded for the compilation with long-term collaborator Tony Visconti." The album's title comes from a lyric in the song "Sunday" from Bowie's 2002 album Heathen.

The different formats of Nothing Has Changed all offer different tracks and mixes compared to the others. The three-disc version includes songs from Bowie's unreleased 2001 album Toy: "Your Turn to Drive", previously a download-only single, and a previously unreleased re-recorded version of "Let Me Sleep Beside You", as well as the 2003 Ken Scott mix of "Life on Mars?", the 2007 Tony Visconti mix single edit of "Young Americans", the stereo mix of "All the Young Dudes", and the 4:08 radio edit of "Love Is Lost (Hello Steve Reich mix)" (the last two of which are also included on the two-disc version). All formats contain what biographer Nicholas Pegg calls the "loud" single mix of "Starman", while the one- and two-disc versions contains the 4:46 promotional edit of "Absolute Beginners".

However, the compilation also contains numerous discrepancies in its track listings. The 'UK stereo mix' of "Space Oddity" found on the vinyl and one-disc versions is actually a new edit sourced from the 2015 remaster (Pegg also notes that the song was recorded in mono). The version of "Diamond Dogs" is a new edit containing both a fade-in and an early fade-out, while "Ziggy Stardust" edits out the final guitar notes. The track listed as "Fashion (single version)" is not in fact the original single edit and has been incorrectly re-edited. The versions of "Under Pressure", "Dancing in the Street" and "Buddha of Suburbia" are the original single versions but are not listed as such. "Silly Boy Blue", track 18 on disc 3, is incorrectly listed as being from David Bowie (1969) but is actually from his previous self-titled album, David Bowie (1967). Pegg further notes that Bowie's Tin Machine period is completely absent from the compilation, his Berlin Trilogy is only represented by one track per album, and there is a huge absence of live recordings.

Release
Nothing Has Changed was released on 18 November 2014 through Parlophone in the United Kingdom, and Columbia Records and Legacy Recordings in the United States. The album was released in four formats: a triple CD version (sequenced in reverse chronological order), a double CD version (sequenced in chronological order), a double LP version, and a single CD version released exclusive to select countries.

The album's multiple cover artworks were designed by Jonathan Barnbrook, who previously designed the artworks for Heathen (2002), Reality (2003) and The Next Day (2013), and would do the same for Blackstar (2016). Each format received a different image, all selected from shots of Bowie taken throughout his life depicting him studying himself in a mirror.

A revised version of the two-disc Nothing Has Changed, re-titled Bowie Legacy, was released on 11 November 2016 and includes selections from Blackstar.

Commercial performance
Nothing Has Changed entered the official UK Albums Chart at number nine upon its release, becoming Bowie's 29th UK Top 10 album, although it quickly fell out of the Top 30. Despite having four more separate successive runs in the Top 100 during 2015, it never got any higher than number 40.

On 15 January 2016, the album re-entered the chart at a new peak of number five, after the news of Bowie's death earlier that week. Two weeks later, Nothing Has Changed remained at number five on 29 January, in a week which saw four other Bowie albums in the top 10, making him the first artist to achieve five simultaneous UK top 10 albums since Michael Jackson, who achieved six in July 2009 after his own death, and a total of twelve in the top 40. This meant he equalled the record set by Elvis Presley after his death in 1977. Nothing Has Changed also gained new peaks worldwide in countries where it had never made the top 10, rising to number one in New Zealand (where it spent four weeks), number three in Australia, number four in Austria and Germany, and number five in Switzerland. It also rose into the top 10 in Belgium, Hungary, Italy and the Netherlands.

Critical reception

Nothing Has Changed, particularly the three-disc version, received critical acclaim. Critics gave unanimous praise to its reverse chronological sequencing. Writing for AllMusic, Stephen Thomas Erlewine stated, "it's a sly way to revisit and recontextualise a career that has been compiled many, many times before." Evan Sawdey of PopMatters agreed, writing that the sequencing of the three-disc version creates "a fascinating aural experience", giving the listener a sense of Bowie's "out-there weirdness" early on, as well as a taste of the artist's influences. Similarly, Cody Ray Shafer of Under the Radar praised the sequencing of the three-disc version, finding that this allows the listener to appreciate the artist in an entirely different way. Shafer further praised the new track "Sue", writing that it is "remarkably unlike anything he's ever done before."

Many have considered the three-disc version one of Bowie's finest compilations, including Erlewine, who praised it as "[an album] that makes us hear an artist we know well in a whole new way." Andrzej Lukowski of Drowned in Sound further called it, "a monument to an extraordinary 50-year-career" and "a statement of self-belief in Bowie's post-superstardom work that surely stands as the most pugnacious best of ever released by an artist of his stature." Similarly, Sawday called Nothing Has Changed "a thrilling go-to for the semi-casual Thin White Duke observer, and is about as damn close to perfect as a Bowie anthology can get." Hal Horowitz of American Songwriter found the three-disc version to be the best way for a new or unfamiliar listener to start with the artist, as well as for established listeners to catch up on his most recent period with The Next Day. A writer for Classic Rock magazine found the collection to be "a great way of refreshing an often overly familiar catalogue." Douglas Wolk of Pitchfork felt out of all the released formats, the three-disc version was the "jewel". He criticised the two-disc version as a slight revision of 2002's Best of Bowie, further stating "it...misses most of what's magical about this particular artist;" he considered the double LP version an improvement.

Despite its acclaim, the collection was criticised for the exclusion of tracks Bowie recorded with the rock band Tin Machine. Regarding the exclusion, Holowitz stated, "It's a logical omission but still a segment of his oeuvre that deserves at least a nod." Lukowski felt that the absence of Tin Machine was the collection's "only real fault", while Wolk agreed that the exclusion was a weak point. Wolk was further disappointed with the absence of tracks such as "Suffragette City", "DJ" and "John, I'm Only Dancing". Some reviewers agreed that certain eras of Bowie's career, including the Berlin Trilogy, were under-represented. Sawdey noted the absence of more Berlin tracks a disappointment, especially when compared to including rarities from the unreleased Toy project. Erlewine also felt the Ziggy Stardust years were under-represented. Both Wolk and Horowitz also criticised the inclusion of the collaboration "Dancing in the Street". Some reviewers found the collection's title ironic, as throughout Bowie's long career, everything changed.

Track listings
All songs written by David Bowie, except where noted.

2-CD edition

3-CD deluxe edition

Double vinyl edition

Single disc edition (exclusive to select countries)

Charts and certifications

Weekly charts

Year-end charts

Certifications

Release history

Notes

References

Sources

External links
 

2014 compilation albums
Columbia Records compilation albums
David Bowie compilation albums
Legacy Recordings compilation albums
Parlophone compilation albums